Tournes is a commune in the Ardennes department in northern France.

Population

Geography
The river Sormonne forms most of the commune's southern border.

See also
Communes of the Ardennes department

References

Communes of Ardennes (department)
Ardennes communes articles needing translation from French Wikipedia